Gagaj Maraf Solomone is a former Fijian political leader and district chief from the district of Noa’tau, on the island of Rotuma. He served in the Senate from 2001 to 2006 as the nominee of the Council of Rotuma. He was succeeded in this capacity by Dr John Fatiaki in June 2006.

References

Rotuman members of the Senate (Fiji)
Rotuman people
Living people
Year of birth missing (living people)
21st-century Fijian politicians